Arnold Mill is an unincorporated community in Fulton County, in the U.S. state of Georgia. It is included in article about Historic mills of the Atlanta area.

History
A variant name is "Arnold". A post office called Arnold was established in 1883, and remained in operation until 1903. The community was named after Givens White Arnold, a pioneer citizen.

References

Unincorporated communities in Fulton County, Georgia
Unincorporated communities in Georgia (U.S. state)